Yekaterina Viktorovna Lisina (born 15 October 1987), also known as Ekaterina Lisina, is a Russian model and former basketball player. She currently holds a Guinness World Record as the tallest professional model. Throughout her basketball career, she competed for the Russian National Team at the 2008 Summer Olympics, winning the bronze medal.

World record holder
Lisina held two world records: the record for the woman with the longest legs  and for the tallest professional model , both noted in the Guinness World Records 2018. She also has been officially recognized as having the largest feet (EU 49, US 16) of a woman in Russia. In October 2020, the world record for woman with the longest legs (over 1.34 m) went to US teenager, Maci Currin.

Popular culture
In addition to modeling, Lisina is a cosplayer who portrayed the Resident Evil Village antagonist Lady Dimitrescu. As of November 2022 she has a social media following that has surpassed 10,000,000 garnering over 117,000,000 "likes".

Personal life
Lisina is fond of reading and singing karaoke. She easily communicates on the Internet and loves to take pictures. Lisina used to embroider paintings.

She is a follower of Hinduism and became a vegetarian after she converted.

On January 24, 2011, Ekaterina Lisina gave birth to her son.

In 2013, she starred in the video of the USB group "Two Meters of Love".

References

External links
 
 

Living people
Russian women's basketball players
Basketball players at the 2008 Summer Olympics
Olympic bronze medalists for Russia
Olympic basketball players of Russia
Russian female models
1987 births
Olympic medalists in basketball
Medalists at the 2008 Summer Olympics
Universiade medalists in basketball
Sportspeople from Penza
Converts to Hinduism from Christianity
Russian Hindus
Universiade silver medalists for Russia
Centers (basketball)
Medalists at the 2009 Summer Universiade